Simkania, is a genus of bacteria belonging to the Chlamydiota. The only  species of this genus is Simkania negevensis.

References

Chlamydiota
Monotypic bacteria genera
Bacteria genera